is a former Japanese football player.

Playing career
Shimizu was born in Yamanashi Prefecture on August 18, 1975. After graduating from high school, he joined Bellmare Hiratsuka in 1994. However he could not play at all in the match and left the club end of 1994 season. After that, he played his local club Ventforet Kofu. He retired end of 1999 season.

Club statistics

References

External links

1975 births
Living people
Association football people from Yamanashi Prefecture
Japanese footballers
J1 League players
J2 League players
Shonan Bellmare players
Ventforet Kofu players
Association football midfielders